Ajnabee is a 2001 Indian Hindi-language mystery thriller film directed by Abbas–Mustan and produced by Vijay Galani. It stars Akshay Kumar, Bobby Deol, Kareena Kapoor Khan and Bipasha Basu, with Johnny Lever, Dalip Tahil, Narendra Bedi and Sharat Saxena in supporting roles. The story involves arround Raj and Priya befriend their new neighbours Vicky and Sonia. One day, Raj wakes up in Vicky's house and finds out that Sonia is killed and he is framed for it. He goes on the run in order to prove himself innocent. The film is an adaptation of the 1992 American thriller Consenting Adults.

The film marked second collaboration between Kumar and Abbas–Mustan after Khiladi (1992) as well as the second collaboration between Deol and Abbas–Mustan after Soldier (1998). The music was composed by Anu Malik.

The film was released on 21 September 2001 and received mixed reviews from the critics with praise for the performances of Kumar and Basu but was a moderate success at box office, grossing ₹31 crore against the budget of ₹17 crore. Kumar won Filmfare Award for Best Performance in a Negative Role while Basu won Best Female Debut.

Plot
Raj Malhotra and Priya Malhotra meet by chance and fall in love after a whirlwind romance. They marry and reside in Switzerland, where they meet their Indian neighbors: the easygoing Vikram "Vicky"  Bajaj and Diva Sonia Bajaj. The couples quickly become friends and go on a Christmas vacation together to Mauritius.

During their vacation, Raj sees Vikram kissing and looking intimate with another woman. A confused Raj becomes even more shocked as Sonia starts hitting on Raj, who awkwardly rejects her. Nonetheless, Raj is smitten with Sonia's figure, which Vikram finds out. He opens up about their (Vicky and Sonia) open relationship, with the woman earlier being one of his dalliances. As Sonia becomes more forward in her advances, Vicky manipulates the scenario leading to Raj and Sonia getting paired with himself (Vicky) getting paired with Priya. On the last day, Vicky casually talks to Raj about (wife swapping), and Vicky suggests Raj to enjoy with Sonia overnight and request Raj to let him (Vicky) enjoy with priya , without their wives' knowledge and both of them enjoying the other'. Raj is disgusted by the offer, and an argument breaks out between the  men. With Priya being unaware of the whole situation going around her, she manages to reconcile Raj and Vicky on the eve of Vicky's birthday a few days later. The two men celebrate by getting drunk together and sharing bottles of alcohol. Once again, Vikram asks whether he could become Raj for one night and tells Raj to become Vikram as a special birthday gift, which Raj rebuffs. Still, Vicky manages to trick an abbreviated Raj into sending him to his and Sonia's bedroom, while he happily goes on ,to Raj's house to meet Priya in the dead of night.

The next day Raj wakes up to find a semi-naked woman in bed with him and realizes he was tricked and is in Vicky's house. Furious and weighed down by his own forgetfulness the previous night, Raj imagines Vicky successfully convincing Priya to continue the wife-swapping overnight and imagines Vicky seducing Priya, and them romancing each other with wild passion in every corner of the house and ending the night with Priya giving Vicky his birthday gift by allowing him to have Sexual intercourse with Priya in her bedroom. Moments later, Sonia is found dead, and Raj is accused of her murder since his fingerprints are found on the murder weapon – an alcohol bottle. Vicky exclaims how the idea of wife swapping came from Raj, and while Vicky just spent the night in raj's house, Raj tried to force Sonia and later killed her. Determined to prove his innocence, Raj manages to escape from the court and is chased by the Swiss police. He meets Priya, who eventually believes in his innocence and aids him in finding out what really happened. With help from one of his neighbors, the Malhotras find that Vicky entered the house on the supposed night with someone. They decide to search Vikram's house, only to be interrupted by Vikram, who calls the police and then reveals that everything was planned in advance. Raj escapes in Vikram's car with Priya.

Raj finds a boarding pass that belongs to Sonia Bajaj, which states that Sonia arrived in Zürich from Geneva on 29 December – however, Sonia was supposedly murdered on that night. Raj suspects her as the woman he saw with Vikram in Mauritius. They travel to Geneva, where Raj meets an insurance officer who is trying to find evidence that Vikram was involved in the death of his wife in order to receive her life insurance payment of $100 million. Working with the insurance agent, Raj traces Vikram to a cruise ship. There, he sees Vikram dancing with a woman revealed to be 'Sonia,' alive and well. Raj confronts Vikram, who finally explains the devious plan – the woman he kissed in Mauritius was his actual wife, Sonia Bajaj. In contrast, the woman with him, Priya and Raj were introduced to in Switzerland is his girlfriend, Neeta. Vikram, a struggling musician, married the wealthy and glamorous Sonia and convinced her to take out an insurance plan of $100 million on herself. He then formulated a plan with Neeta to have Sonia murdered so that they could collect the money.

Vikram boasts about having pinned the murder on Raj. However, Raj takes Vikram to a computer and shows him his empty bank account. Raj says that he had guessed the password, "Everything is planned", something that Vikram used to say a lot, and used it to transfer the money back to the insurance company. Raj also reveals that everything Vikram said had been recorded. A fight erupts between the two and Neeta dies in the conflict. Angered at losing Neeta, Vikram gets aggressive, killing the insurance officer. He chases Priya to kill her, but Raj impales Vikram with an anchor from the cruise ship, killing him. Raj and Priya return to India in the end.

Cast
Akshay Kumar as Vikram Bajaj
Bobby Deol as Raj Malhotra
Kareena Kapoor as Priya Malhotra, Raj's wife.
Bipasha Basu as Neeta, Vikram's girlfriend / Fake Sonia Bajaj. 
Johnny Lever as Bhanu Pradhan
Amita Nangia as Champa Devi
Dalip Tahil as Priya's father
Sharat Saxena as Insurance Officer
Sheela Sharma as Veena Chandra Devi
Narendra Bedi as Lakhan Pal
Mink Brar as real Sonia Bajaj

Production
Originally, actress Mahek Chahal was cast in the role of Neeta (Fake Sonia) which eventually was given to Bipasha Basu. The climax of the film was shot in Muscat, Dubai and Bahrain on the Indian-owned cruise liner Ocean Majesty. Initially Shah Rukh Khan was offered the role of Akshay Kumar, but he wasn’t keen on playing a gray character.

Soundtrack

The soundtrack for Ajnabee is composed by Anu Malik and the lyrics are penned by Sameer. It is released by Tips Music.

In 2011, ten years after the release of Ajnabee, Malik claimed that the song "Character Dheela" from the film Ready is an unauthorised copy of the song "Mohabbat Naam Hai" while informing the media that he will likely file a suit against composer, Pritam for plagiarism. According to the Indian trade website Box Office India, with around 22,00,000 units sold, this film's soundtrack album was the year's sixth highest-selling.

Reception

Box office
The film grossed  31.83 crore worldwide.

Critical response
Taran Adarsh of IndiaFM gave the film 1.5 stars oyut of 5, writing ″On the whole, AJNABEE tackles an audacious theme that the Indian audience will find hard to absorb and identify with. The film, which boasts of impressive names on and off the screen, will attract the audiences for the first few days, but its fall is imminent after the initial euphoria settles. A heavy price tag will also prove a deterrent for its investors.″ Sarita Tanwar of Rediff.com wrote ″It has been shot at exotic locations, but the film has a shoddy feel to it. The camerawork jars; the filmmakers lose control of the script at the climax, when vague scenes are pieced together. The comic relief, spearheaded by Johny Lever, is loud and the insipid humour goes overboard. Sadly, this bold attempt is in vain. Ajnabee could have been the precursor of the new niche thriller. But its makers haven't displayed enough bravado. Watch Ajnabee once. Not for what it is. But for what it could have been.

In a retrospective review on film's 20th anniversary, Sampada Sharma of The Indian Express wrote ″Ajnabee’s world has people doing net banking in a way that makes you go ‘What!?’ and characters planning schemes that are half-witted to begin with, yet it makes you stick around for its performative dialogues, over-the-top acting and a plot so dramatic that you continue to watch just to see what bizarre thing will happen next. It’s been 20 years since we saw this beautiful, delicious mess and revisiting it now is still a chuckle-worthy experience.″

Awards and nominations

Filmfare Awards
Won
 Best Villain – Akshay Kumar
 Best Female Debut – Bipasha Basu
Nominated
 Best Male Playback Singer – Adnan Sami – 'Mehbooba Mehbooba'
 Best Comedian – Johnny Lever

References

External links
 
 

2001 films
Films directed by Abbas–Mustan
Films set in India
Films set in Mauritius
Films set in Switzerland
Films shot in Dubai
2000s Hindi-language films
Indian crime thriller films
Hindi remakes of English films
Indian remakes of American films
Films scored by Anu Malik
Films shot in Bahrain
Films shot in Switzerland
Films shot in Mauritius
Films with screenplays by Robin Bhatt
Films scored by Surinder Sodhi
Hindi-language crime films
2001 crime thriller films